The 2014–15 Liiga season was the 40th season of the Liiga (formerly SM-liiga), the top level of ice hockey in Finland, since the league's formation in 1975.

Teams

Regular season
Top six advanced straight to quarter-finals, while teams between 7th and 10th positions played wild card round for the final two spots. The Liiga is a closed series and thus there is no relegation.

Playoffs

Bracket

Wild card round (best-of-three)

(7) HIFK vs. (10) Ilves

HIFK wins the series 2-0.

(8) SaiPa vs. (9) Ässät

SaiPa wins the series 2-0.

Quarterfinals (best-of-seven)

(1) Kärpät vs. (8) SaiPa

Kärpät wins the series 4-1.

(2) Tappara vs. (7) HIFK

Tappara wins the series 4-2.

(3) Lukko vs. (6) KalPa

Lukko wins the series 4-2.

(4) JYP vs. (5) Blues

JYP wins the series 4-0.

Semifinals (best-of-seven)

(1) Kärpät vs. (4) JYP

Kärpät wins the series 4-3.

(2) Tappara vs. (3) Lukko

Tappara wins the series 4–3.

Bronze medal game

Finals (best-of-seven) 

Kärpät wins the finals 4–3.

Final rankings

References

External links
Official site of the Liiga

Liiga seasons
1
Fin